Phoenix King (불사조 로보트 피닉스킹 Bulsajo roboteu Pinikseu-King) is a South Korean animated feature film. It was later dubbed into English and released in America and Europe as Defenders of Space and parts of its footage was used to create Space Thunder Kids. The small image of the movie poster depicts a toy version of Phoenix King that was released.

Phoenix King is identical to a Diaclone toy No.10 Fire Engine, that later became Inferno of the Transformers. This is the earliest animated version of said toy.

Criticism
The film is infamous for copying designs from numerous Super Robot Series in Japan, especially Mazinger Z, Ippatsuman, Space Cruiser Yamato, Mobile Suit Gundam and many of Leiji Matsumoto's work. China's Astro Plan later is said to have ripped off far more numerous series.

External links
 Phoenix-bot Phoenix King at Mimanbu 
 Karaeff 
 
 Phoenix Robot Phoenixing (Bulsajo Roboteu Pinikseu King) at the Korean Movie Database

1984 films
South Korean animated science fiction films
1980s Korean-language films
Animated films about robots